Kuchanpally is a village in Haveli ghanapur mandal of Medak district, Telangana State, India.

See also
 Villages in medak mandal

References

Villages in Medak district